Meyer (Mike) Levin  (June 5, 1916 - January 7, 1943) was a World War II B-17 Flying Fortress bombardier, pilot, and war hero. Three days after the surprise attack on Pearl Harbor, he flew on a mission with pilot Colin Kelly against the Japanese navy. Kelly died trying to save his crew and became a war hero. On that mission, Levin became the first American to blow up a Japanese warship. During his subsequent 60 combat missions, Levin also sank an enemy ship during the Battle of the Coral Sea.

A year later, although he was off duty, he volunteered to be the spotter and bombardier for a combat mission near New Guinea. During its return, the B-17 ran low on fuel and made a forced landing into stormy seas. Levin remained in the plane and released the life raft which saved the lives of the three other crew members. In doing so, however, Levin was injured and died when the plane sank.

Levin won the distinguished flying cross for bombing the IJN light cruiser Natori, the silver star for a direct hit on a 15,000 ton Japanese transport, and the oak leaf cluster for gallantry. He is remembered as one of the first American heroes of World War II for sacrificing his own life to save members of his crew.

Early life
Levin was born June 5, 1916, in Rochester, New York to Jewish parents, Samuel Levin and Leah Levin.  The family moved to Brooklyn when Meyer was 14 years old. His father was a tailor and clothing inspector for the Navy; they lived at 1504 East Thirty-third Street in Brooklyn.

After Levin graduated from Brooklyn Technical High School, he enrolled in a government aeronautical school, where he graduated second highest in his class. He spent the next three years trying to find work in the aircraft industry, but was continually denied a job due to his Jewish heritage. He then decided to enlist in the military.

Army Air Corps
Levin enlisted in the Army Air Corps in 1939 where he began work with a ground crew in the Philippines. After Pearl Harbor was attacked by the Japanese on December 7, 1941, he became a bombardier with the 19th Operations Group. One of his first missions was on a B-17 Flying Fortress on December 10, piloted by Captain Colin Kelly. When Kelly turned the controls over to Levin, Levin bombed and severely damaged the IJN light cruiser Natori, setting the ship ablaze after three successful hits. Levin recalls: "In the Jap convoy was a battleship protecting landing operations and we made this our target. It was what you might call a bombardier's dream...Fifteen seconds before I released the bombs I knew I was going to hit the ship." (Some news reports mistakenly identified the ship as the Japanese battleship Haruna, which was in the Gulf of Siam at the time.)

On the return flight the plane was hit by Japanese fighter planes and caught fire. As the plane lost power and dropped downward toward the sea, Kelly told the four other crew members, including Levin, to bail out while he tried to keep the plane straight and level. Kelly died when the plane crashed near the Philippines.

For bombing the Japanese cruiser, Levin became the first American to blow up and sink a Japanese warship. Newspaper headlines covered the story about Kelly's death and Levin as his bombardier. 2,500 residents of Brooklyn presented a plaque to Levin's parents to honor their son's war efforts.

When the Philippines fell under Japanese domination, Levin, along with fellow crew member Haskell Wexler, a future cinematographer, were then stationed in Australia, at General Macarthur's headquarters. From there, Levin took part in over 60 missions over the following year, including the Battle of the Coral Sea, where he sank a 15,000-ton Japanese transport. On a furlough soon after, while visiting his East Flatbush home, over 2,000 neighbors gave Levin a hero's welcome and designated the occasion "Meyer Levin Day."

He made his last flight on January 7, 1943. Although he was then off duty, he volunteered to accompany the crew since he was a skilled spotter. Co-pilot Lt. John Barbee says that Levin was a "clever observer and an expert at identifying enemy ships." He could also hit his targets "better than the officers," according to an officer who flew with him. "He never left the bombsight even when the Japs were shooting at him."

But on its return home the plane ran low on fuel and hit a major storm, which forced the plane to fly just above wave height. "The situation was hopeless," recalls Barbee, "and suddenly all the motors stalled. The Fortress plunged into the sea ..." Barbee remembers last seeing Levin grasping for the safety hatches which released the raft. But while releasing the raft, Levin was injured and never got out. The other three crew members, including Barbee, survived. Barbee says "I can't remember how I got out of the ship. I remember scrambling aboard the life raft and marveling that it was already afloat." They spent thirteen hours on the raft before they were rescued. The story ran in the New York Times:

Army Chief of Staff George Marshall sent Levin's parents a personal note of condolence. Later, writer and broadcaster Lowell Thomas credited Levin for being a "star of the historic 19th Operations Group, with its continuous pursuit of Japanese warships. A few months after Levin's death, over 1,000 people attended a memorial service for him in Brooklyn.

To honor Levin, the United Jewish War Effort, in February 1943, through its chairman rabbi Stephen Samuel Wise, sent the Soviet Red Army 100 medical field units bearing Levin's name. It then began another campaign to produce Memorial Medical Field Units for the U.S. Army. In March 1943, the Jewish War Veterans organization raised $75,000 toward a goal of $350,000, to replace the plane in which Levin lost his life.

Notes

External links

1916 births
1943 deaths
United States Army Air Forces personnel killed in World War II
Recipients of the Distinguished Flying Cross (United States)
Recipients of the Silver Star
20th-century American Jews
Aviators killed by being shot down